Piletocera meekii is a moth in the family Crambidae. It was described by Thomas Pennington Lucas in 1894. It is found on the Indonesean island of Java and the Australian state of Queensland.

Adults are dark brown with two white marks on the costa and a broken white line across the wingtip of the forewings. There are two broken wiggly white lines crossing the hindwings.

References

meekii
Moths described in 1894
Moths of Indonesia
Moths of Australia